Maiestas variegata (formerly Recilia variegata) is a species of insect from the Cicadellidae family that is endemic to Kuril Islands. It was formerly placed within Recilia, but a 2009 revision moved it to Maiestas.

References

Kuril Islands
Hemiptera of Asia
Maiestas